Stinga morrisoni, or Morrison's skipper, is a species of grass skipper in the butterfly family Hesperiidae. It is found in Central America and North America.

The MONA or Hodges number for Stinga morrisoni is 4017.

References

Further reading

 

Hesperiinae
Articles created by Qbugbot